American Tunes  is the final recording from New Orleans jazz and R&B pianist Allen Toussaint, released on Nonesuch Records on June 10, 2016. It was produced by Joe Henry and includes music from a 2013 solo session at the pianist's home studio in New Orleans and an October 2015 session featuring musicians Bill Frisell, Charles Lloyd, Greg Leisz, Jay Bellerose, and David Piltch, with special guest vocalist Rhiannon Giddens and pianist Van Dyke Parks, recorded in Los Angeles the month before Toussaint died.

The album title is taken from the 1973 Paul Simon song "American Tune," which Toussaint performs on the album. Also included are songs written or recorded by Toussaint, Professor Longhair (Henry Roeland Byrd), Duke Ellington, Bill Evans, and Fats Waller.

Allen Toussaint was due to play with Paul Simon in a New Orleans benefit concert to celebrate the 30th anniversary of New Orleans Artists Against Hunger and Homelessness, an organization Toussaint co-founded, on December 8, 2015; instead, Simon played the concert without Toussaint in tribute to the late musician. "Allen Toussaint brought New Orleans to the world," Simon has said, "and he left before he could bless us with the complete genius of his music."

Track listing
 "Delores' Boyfriend" (Allen Toussaint) – 3:35
 "Viper's Drag" (Thomas "Fats" Waller) – 3:18
 "Confessin' (That I Love You)" (Doc Daugherty, Ellis Reynolds & Al Neiburg) – 2:52
 "Mardis Gras in New Orleans" (Henry Roeland "Roy" Byrd) – 3:15	
 "Lotus Blossom" (Billy Strayhorn) – 4:20
 "Waltz for Debby" (Bill Evans) – 3:17
 "Big Chief" (Earl King) – 2:15
 "Rocks in My Bed" (Duke Ellington) – 4:40
 "Danza, Op. 33" (Louis Moreau Gottschalk) – 3:27
 "Hey Little Girl" (Henry Roeland "Roy" Byrd) – 2:38
 "Rosetta" (Earl "Fatha" Hines) – 4:10
 "Come Sunday" (Duke Ellington) – 5:12
 "Southern Nights" (Allen Toussaint) – 3:33
 "American Tune" (Paul Simon) – 4:59

Personnel 
Allen Toussaint – piano and vocals
Jay Bellerose – drums and percussion
Bill Frisell – electric guitar
Greg Leisz – weissenborn
Charles Lloyd – tenor saxophone
David Piltch – upright bass
Adam Levy – gut-string guitar
Cameron Stone – cello
Amy Shulman – harp
Rhiannon Giddens – vocals
Van Dyke Parks – second piano and orchestral arrangement
Ryan Freeland - recording engineer, mixer

References 

Allen Toussaint albums
2016 albums
Albums produced by Joe Henry
Nonesuch Records albums